HDMS Norge was a Royal Dano-Norwegian Navy ship-of-the-line, built to a design by F. C. H. Hohlenberg.  The British Royal Navy seized her in 1807, together with the rest of the Danish fleet after the second battle of Copenhagen. She served off Spain, in the editerranean, and in the North Sea. Then in 181

In British Service
She was fitted out at Portsmouth from 21 November 1807 to 11 December 1808.

Napoleonic Wars
She was commissioned in April 1808 under Captain Edmund Boger. She was at Corunna in January 1809. It had been intended to rename her as Nonsuch in 1809 but the order was rescinded. From 1810 she was commanded by Captain John Sprat Rainier and was in the vicinity of Cadiz. In 1811 she was under the command of Temporary Captain William Waller, deployed in the Mediterranean. From 1812 to 1814, she was under the command of Captain Samuel Jackson, and sailed the North Sea.

War of 1812
In August 1814, she was under the command of Captain Charles Dashwood. In September 1814, she set sail for North America, in convoy with transport ships carrying Major General John Keane and reinforcements to North America. Embarked aboard the Norge were Major Munro's company of the Royal Artillery and Lieutenant Hill. The crew of the Norge participated in the Battle of Lake Borgne where her quartermaster was killed. The British lost 17 men killed and 77 wounded.  then evacuated the wounded. In 1821 the survivors of the flotilla shared in the distribution of head-money arising from the capture of the American gun-boats and sundry bales of cotton.
In 1847 the Admiralty issued a clasp (or bar) marked "14 Dec. Boat Service 1814" to survivors of the boat service who claimed the clasp to the Naval General Service Medal.

Fate
She was paid off in August 1815. In March 1816 she was sold for £3000 at Chatham.

Notes, citations, and references
Notes

Citations

References

 
 
 
 
 
 
 
 
 
 

War of 1812 ships of the United Kingdom